Allopsontus is a genus of the family Machilidae which belongs to the insect order Archaeognatha (jumping bristletails). Certain species in this genus have been found as high as 5 kilometres above sea level on the Himalayas.

Species
Allopsontus annandalei Silvestri, 1911
Allopsontus armenicus Mendes, 1983
Allopsontus davydovae Kaplin, 1987
Allopsontus europaeus Kaplin, 1983
Allopsontus kerzhneri Kaplin, 1982
Allopsontus lineatus Kaplin, 2002
Allopsontus oubehi Bitsch, 1968
Allopsontus schmidi Wygodzinsky, 1974
Allopsontus spinosissimus Mendes, 1981
Allopsontus swani Wygodzinsky, 1974
Allopsontus tianshanicus Kaplin, 1982
Allopsontus tuxeni Wygodzinsky, 1950
Allopsontus wygodzinskyi Bitsch, 1968

References

Archaeognatha
Fauna of the Himalayas
Taxa named by Filippo Silvestri